Śmiałowski (feminine: Śmiałowska; plural: Śmiałowscy) is a Polish surname. 
Notable people with the name Śmiałowski/Smialowski include:

 Brendan Smialowski (born c. 1981), American photographer 
 Igor Śmiałowski (1917–2006), Polish actor

See also
 
 Śmiłowski

References

Polish-language surnames